Sunset Park (Original Motion Picture Soundtrack) is the soundtrack to Steve Gomer's 1996 film Sunset Park. It was released on April 23, 1996 through EastWest Records America/Elektra Music Group.

Recording sessions took place at Can-Am Studios, at Larrabee Studio and at Americayan Recording Studio in Los Angeles, at 36 Chambers Studio, at The Hit Factory, at Giant Recording Studio and at D&D Studios in New York, at Undercity Studios in Hackensack, at KrossWire Studio in Atlanta, at The Junk Yard in Orlando, and at Doorway Studios in Dallas.

Production was handled by Alan Fouse, Bass Mechanics, Bryce Wilson, Carl Roland, Charles Jordan, Darren Lighty, Daz Dillinger, Easy Mo Bee, Jermaine Dupri, Livio Harris, Miles Goodman, Mobb Deep, RZA, Sergio, Tony Pizarro, and KayGee who also served as executive soundtrack album producer along with Merlin Bobb, Queen Latifah, Sha-Kim and Sylvia Rhone.

It features contributions from 2Pac, 69 Boyz, Aaliyah, Adina Howard, Big Mike, Ghostface Killah, Groove Theory, Junior M.A.F.I.A., MC Lyte, Mobb Deep, Onyx, Quad City DJ's, Queen Latifah, Raekwon, Spank D, Tha Dogg Pound, Xscape and Miles Goodman.

The album peaked at number four on the Billboard 200 and at number one on the Top R&B/Hip-Hop Albums. On June 18, 1996, it was certified Platinum by the Recording Industry Association of America. In 2012 Complex magazine listed the album #8 on its 'The 25 Best Hip-Hop Movie Soundtracks Of All Time'.

Track listing 

Notes
Tracks 5, 6 and 12 did not appear in the film.
Sample credits
Track 2 contains elements from traditional song "Motherless Child" and "Into Something (Can't Shake Loose)" written by James Shaw and Earl Randle as both performed by O. V. Wright
Track 4 embodies portions of "The Look of Love" written by Burt Bacharach and Hal David as performed by Isaac Hayes
Track 5 contains samples from "Movin' In The Right Direction" written and performed by Steve Parks
Track 8 contains replayed portion of "Liberian Girl" written by Michael Jackson
Track 10 contains elements from "One Nation Under A Groove" written by George Clinton, Garry Shider and Walter Morrison
Track 12 contains samples from "Heads Ain't Redee" written by Barrett Powell, Jack McNair, Darrell Yates, Sean Price, James Bush, Tekomin Williams, Kenyatta Blake and Gil Evans, and performed by Black Moon & Smif 'n Wessun, "One More Chance" written by Sean Combs, Christopher Wallace, Carl Thompson and the Bluez Brothers and performed by the Notorious B.I.G., "The Loc Is On His Own" written by James Savage, Nathaniel Motley and George Clinton, and performed by Jayo Felony

Personnel

Anita Camarata – executive music producer, management
Dana Owens – executive soundtrack album producer
Kier Lamont Gist – executive soundtrack album producer
Merlin Bobb-Willis – executive soundtrack album producer
Sylvia Rhone – executive soundtrack album producer
Shakim Compere – executive soundtrack album producer
Dedra N. Tate – co-executive soundtrack album producer, management
Mary Kusnier – project coordinator, management
Shirley Bell – music supervisor, management
Rosa Menkes – design
Aaron Seawood – management
Abigail Adams – management
Alan Voss – management
Anne Kristoff – management
Annette Chaparro – management
Aurora Montes De Oca – management
Beth Patterson – management
Billy Allrich – management
Brian Cohen – management
Carolyn Tracey – management
Darryl "Latee" French – management
Donna Johns – management
Gary Casson – management
Greg Robinson – management
Greg Thompson – management
Jade Robledo – management
Karen Mason – management
Kevin Weekes – management
Lauren Spencer – management
Lisa West – management
Mae Attaway – management
Michael "Blue" Williams – management
Monya Vanderpool – management
Morshia Ellis – management
Paul Compere – management
Rene McLean – management
Richard Nash – management
Rick A. Brown – management
Rita Owens – management
Sandra Cordoba – management
Sonia Ives – management
Steve Heldt – management
Steve Kleinberg – management
Jacque L. Shirley – legal advice & counsel

Charts

Weekly charts

Year-end charts

Certifications

See also
List of Billboard number-one R&B albums of 1996

References

External links

1996 soundtrack albums
Sports film soundtracks
Hip hop soundtracks
Rhythm and blues soundtracks
Albums produced by RZA
Albums produced by KayGee
Albums produced by Easy Mo Bee
Albums produced by Daz Dillinger
Albums produced by Jermaine Dupri
Albums produced by Havoc (musician)